Dimethylformamide is an organic compound with the formula (CH3)2NC(O)H. Commonly abbreviated as DMF (although this initialism is sometimes used for dimethylfuran, or dimethyl fumarate), this colourless liquid is miscible with water and the majority of organic liquids. DMF is a common solvent for chemical reactions. Dimethylformamide is odorless, but technical-grade or degraded samples often have a fishy smell due to impurity of dimethylamine. Dimethylamine degradation impurities can be removed by sparging samples with an inert gas such as argon or by sonicating the samples under reduced pressure. As its name indicates, it is structurally related to formamide, having two methyl groups in the place of the two hydrogens.  DMF is a polar (hydrophilic) aprotic solvent with a high boiling point. It facilitates reactions that follow polar mechanisms, such as SN2 reactions.

Structure and properties
As for most amides, the spectroscopic evidence indicates partial double bond character for the C-N and C-O bonds.  Thus, the infrared spectrum shows a C=O stretching frequency at only 1675 cm−1, whereas a ketone would absorb near 1700 cm−1. 

DMF is a classic example of a fluxional molecule.

The ambient temperature 1H NMR spectrum shows two methyl signals, indicative of hindered rotation about the (O)C-N bond. At temperatures near 100 °C, the 500 MHz NMR spectrum of this compound shows only one signal for the methyl groups. 

DMF is miscible with water. The vapour pressure at 20 °C is 3.5 hPa. A Henry's law constant of 7.47 × 10−5 hPa m3 mol−1 can be deduced from an experimentally determined equilibrium constant at 25 °C. The partition coefficient log POW is measured to −0.85. Since the density of DMF (0.95 g cm−3 at 20 °C) is similar to that of water, significant flotation or stratification in surface waters in case of accidental losses is not expected.

Reactions
DMF is hydrolyzed by strong acids and bases, especially at elevated temperatures.  With sodium hydroxide, DMF converts to formate and dimethylamine.  DMF undergoes decarbonylation near its boiling point to give dimethylamine.  Distillation is therefore conducted under reduced pressure at lower temperatures.

In one of its main uses in organic synthesis, DMF was a reagent in the Vilsmeier–Haack reaction, which is used to formylate aromatic compounds.  The process involves initial conversion of DMF to a chloroiminium ion, [(CH3)2N=CH(Cl)]+, known as a Vilsmeier reagent, which attacks arenes.

Organolithium compounds and Grignard reagents react with DMF to give aldehydes after hydrolysis in a reaction named after Bouveault.

Dimethylformamide forms 1:1 adducts with a variety of Lewis acids such as the soft acid I2, and the hard acid phenol. It is classified as a hard Lewis base and its ECW model base parameters are EB= 2.19 and CB= 1.31. Its relative donor strength toward a series of acids, versus other Lewis bases, can be illustrated by C-B plots.

Production
DMF was first prepared in 1893 by the French chemist Albert Verley (8 January 1867 – 27 November 1959), by distilling a mixture of dimethylamine hydrochloride and potassium formate.

DMF is prepared by combining methyl formate and dimethylamine or by reaction of dimethylamine with carbon monoxide.

Although currently impractical, DMF can be prepared from supercritical carbon dioxide using ruthenium-based catalysts.

Applications
The primary use of DMF is as a solvent with low evaporation rate. DMF is used in the production of acrylic fibers and plastics. It is also used as a solvent in peptide coupling for pharmaceuticals, in the development and production of pesticides, and in the manufacture of adhesives, synthetic leathers, fibers, films, and surface coatings.

It is used as a reagent in the Bouveault aldehyde synthesis and in the Vilsmeier-Haack reaction, another useful method of forming aldehydes.
It is a common solvent in the Heck reaction.
It is also a common catalyst used in the synthesis of acyl halides, in particular the synthesis of acyl chlorides from carboxylic acids using oxalyl or thionyl chloride. The catalytic mechanism entails reversible formation of an imidoyl chloride (also known as the 'Vilsmeier reagent'):
 

DMF penetrates most plastics and makes them swell. Because of this property DMF is suitable for solid phase peptide synthesis and as a component of paint strippers.
DMF is used as a solvent to recover olefins such as 1,3-butadiene via extractive distillation.
It is also used in the manufacturing of solvent dyes as an important raw material. It is consumed during reaction.
Pure acetylene gas cannot be compressed and stored without the danger of explosion. Industrial acetylene is safely compressed in the presence of dimethylformamide, which forms a safe, concentrated solution. The casing is also filled with agamassan, which renders it safe to transport and use.

As a cheap and common reagent, DMF has many uses in a research laboratory.
DMF is effective at separating and suspending carbon nanotubes, and is recommended by the NIST for use in near infrared spectroscopy of such.
DMF can be utilized as a standard in proton NMR spectroscopy allowing for a quantitative determination of an unknown compound.
In the synthesis of organometallic compounds, it is used as a source of carbon monoxide ligands.
DMF is a common solvent used in electrospinning.
DMF is commonly used in the solvothermal synthesis of metal–organic frameworks.
DMF-d7 in the presence of a catalytic amount of KOt-Bu under microwave heating is a reagent for deuteration of polyaromatic hydrocarbons.

Safety
Reactions including the use of sodium hydride in DMF as a solvent are somewhat hazardous; exothermic decompositions have been reported at temperatures as low as 26 °C. On a laboratory scale any thermal runaway is (usually) quickly noticed and brought under control with an ice bath and this remains a popular combination of reagents. On a pilot plant scale, on the other hand, several accidents have been reported.

Dimethylformamide vapor exposure has shown reduced alcohol tolerance and skin irritation in some cases.

On the 20 of June 2018, the Danish Environmental Protective Agency published an article about the DMF's use in squishies. The density of the compound in the toy resulted in all squishies being removed from the Danish market. All squishies were recommended to be thrown out as household waste.

Toxicity
The acute LD50 (oral, rats and mice) is 2.2–7.55 g/kg. Hazards of DMF have been examined.

References

External links

Concise International Chemical Assessment Document 31: N,N-Dimethylformamide

Hepatotoxins
Formamides
Amide solvents